Saturday Morning with Riders is a studio recording released by the Western band Riders in the Sky in 1992 (see 1992 in music).  It is available as a single CD.

Track listing
 "Texas Plains"
 "Back In The Saddle Again"
 "(Ghost) Riders In The Sky"
 "That's How The Yodel Was Born"
 "Someone's Got To Do It"
 "Ride Cowboy Ride"
 "The Queen Elizabeth Trio"
 "There's A Blue Sky Way Out Yonder"
 "The Cattle Call"
 "So Long Saddle Pals"

Personnel
Douglas B. Green (a.k.a. Ranger Doug) – vocals, guitar
Paul Chrisman (a.k.a. Woody Paul) – vocals, fiddle
Fred LaBour (a.k.a. Too Slim) – vocals, bass

References

Riders in the Sky Official Website

1992 compilation albums
Riders in the Sky (band) compilation albums
MCA Records compilation albums